Charax was an ancient fortress in Aetulane, Lesser Armenia.

References

Former populated places in Turkey
Western Armenia